Karim Azamoum (born 17 January 1990) is a French professional footballer who plays as an attacking midfielder.

Career
After making his debut in the French lower divisions, Azamoum joined Ligue 2 side Troyes AC in 2013. He made his full professional debut a few weeks later, coming on the pitch in the second half of a 3–0 victory over Châteauroux in September 2013.

On 14 February 2016, he scored a brace contributing to Troyes' 3–2 win away to Gazélec Ajaccio in Ligue 1.

On 17 July 2018, Segunda División side Cádiz CF reached an agreement for the transfer of Azamoum, who agreed to a three-year contract with the club. The following 9 January, after being rarely used, he moved to fellow league team Elche CF on a six-month loan deal.

On 11 July 2019, Azamoum agreed to a three-year contract with Albacete Balompié also in the second division. He terminated his contract on 1 February 2021, and returned to his former side Troyes.

Personal life
Azamoum is of Algerian descent.

References

External links

Karim Azamoum foot-national.com Profile

1990 births
Living people
People from Rognac
Sportspeople from Bouches-du-Rhône
French sportspeople of Algerian descent
French footballers
Footballers from Provence-Alpes-Côte d'Azur
Association football midfielders
Ligue 1 players
Ligue 2 players
RCO Agde players
ES Troyes AC players
Segunda División players
Cádiz CF players
Elche CF players
Albacete Balompié players
French expatriate footballers
French expatriate sportspeople in Spain
Expatriate footballers in Spain